Colonel George O'Callaghan-Westropp JP (18 February 1864 – 30 July 1944), also known as The O'Callaghan, was an Irish landowner, soldier and political figure of the early 20th century.

Biography

He was born George O'Callaghan, son of Colonel John O'Callaghan and Mary Johnson Westropp, and raised in the Church of Ireland.
 
He lived at Coolreagh, an Anglo-Irish big house in County Clare. In 1885, he added "Westropp" to his name under the terms of a bequest by his aunt Catherine's husband Ralph, who left him an estate at Fortanne. In 1895, he married Henrietta Cecile Rose Godbold; they had four children.

In 1905, O'Callaghan-Westropp was named honorary Aide de Camp to King Edward VII in the 1905 Birthday Honours.

He inherited his father's estate in 1912,  and five hundred tenants. He styled himself "The O'Callaghan", claiming chieftainship of the Gaelic O'Callaghan (Ó Ceallacháin) sept. They had lost their land in County Cork during the 17th-century Cromwellian conquest of Ireland and were transplanted beyond the River Shannon. The Chief Herald of Ireland in 1943 ruled that the rightful heirs to the Chiefship were an O'Callaghan living in Spain.

O'Callaghan-Westropp was politically a Unionist and a leading member of the County Clare Unionist Club. In 1911, he addressed a meeting of the Hollywood Unionist Club in County Down. He issued a pamphlet, Notes on the Defence of Irish Country Houses.

In 1919, O'Callaghan-Westropp was named as High Sheriff of Clare.

During the Irish War of Independence, O'Callaghan publicly condemned British troops as "running wild" and "recruiting for Sinn Féin by their crimes"; he eventually changed to supporting dominion Home Rule. In reprisal, Black and Tans burned a hay barn and cattle shed on his property and issued a threatening letter.

He was nominated to the short-lived Senate of Southern Ireland in 1921.

In 1925, O'Callaghan-Westropp was proposed for election to the Seanad, but lost the by-election. He was a member of the Farmers' Party.

O'Callaghan-Westropp's wife died in 1929. He remarried in 1937 to Muriel Haidee Battley and died in 1944. He was buried at the family plot in the church of St Mochulla, Tulla.

References

External links
 

1864 births
1944 deaths
High Sheriffs of Clare
Politicians from County Clare
Irish landlords
19th-century Irish landowners
20th-century Irish landowners